These are the international rankings of Antigua and Barbuda.

International rankings

References 

Antigua and Barbuda-related lists
International rankings by country